Rare breed livestock consists of breeds of domesticated animal, generally developed for use in agriculture, which are considered by one or more national charity as being endangered or threatened. A number of societies exist worldwide to preserve these animals.

International
 Rare Breeds International
Europe: SAVE Foundation (Safeguard for Agricultural Varieties in Europe)

Africa
South Africa: Farm Animal Conservation Trust (FACT)

Australasia
Australia: Rare Breeds Trust of Australia
New Zealand: Rare Breeds Conservation Society of New Zealand

North America
Canada: Rare Breeds Canada
United States:
 The Livestock Conservancy
 SVF Foundation

Europe
Germany:
 Gesellschaft zur Erhaltung alter und gefährdeter Haustierrassen (GEH)
 Vielfältige Initiative zur Erhaltung gefährdeter Haustierrassen (VIEH)

Switzerland: ProSpecieRara
Netherlands: Scichting Zeldzame Huisdierrassen (SZH)
United Kingdom: Rare Breeds Survival Trust
France: Fédération pour promouvoir l'Elevage des Races domestiques MEnacées (FERMES)
Spain: Sociedad Española para los Recursos Genéticos Animales (/SERGA)
Belgium: Steunpunt Levend Erfgoed (Support Centre for Living Heritage)
Norway: NordGen Husdyr (Nordic Farm Animal Gene Bank)

References

Rare breed
Rare breed conservation